Frank Wendling (August 25, 1897 – August 30, 1966) was an American long-distance runner. He competed in the marathon at the 1924 Summer Olympics.

References

External links
 

1897 births
1966 deaths
Athletes (track and field) at the 1924 Summer Olympics
American male long-distance runners
American male marathon runners
Olympic track and field athletes of the United States
Track and field athletes from Buffalo, New York
20th-century American people